Cerobasis guestfalica is a species of Psocoptera belonging to the family Trogiidae. It is widespread in the world.

References

Stenopsocidae
Insects described in 1880
Taxa named by Hermann Julius Kolbe
Psocoptera of Europe